Jonathan David Buck (born November 11, 1974) is an American R&B singer, songwriter, and record producer. His debut album, Bonafide (1995), went platinum.

Early life
Born in Providence, Rhode Island, United States and raised in Altadena, California, Buck comes from a musical family; with his father David, a professor of music, his mother Linda, a concert pianist and his siblings Deborah, a violinist and his brother Kevin, a cellist. His mother is Jewish and his father is of Dutch descent. In 1992, Jon B. was shopping demos when he caught the attention of Tracey Edmonds, then-president and CEO of Yab-Yum Records.

Career
Jon B's early influences as a musician include: Duran Duran, INXS, Marvin Gaye, Michael Jackson, Babyface, Prince, and Sade.  He spent the summer after high school writing, producing and recording 40 songs and began making his rounds to all major record labels.

1994–97: Bonafide and Cool Relax
Jon B., before his rise to fame, used to be a songwriter and wrote songs for After 7, Toni Braxton, Michael Jackson, Color Me Badd, the Spice Girls and others.  Jon B.'s popularity began in the mid-1990s, he released his debut studio album in 1995 titled Bonafide; the album spawned the popular hit and Grammy-nominated single "Someone to Love", which featured the Grammy Award-winning artist Babyface. The album was a commercial success as it went platinum, selling over 1 million copies.

He released his second studio album Cool Relax in 1997, the album spawned the top 10 single "They Don't Know" and two other top 20 hits, including Are U Still Down featuring Tupac Shakur. Cool Relax received generally positive reviews from music critics, and it is his most successful album commercially; it has been certified as double platinum by the RIAA.

Jon B also co-wrote the Brownstone hit "5 Miles to Empty" in 1997.

While on tour promoting Cool Relax, he formed a group with two of his back-up singers, Dominiquinn and Silky Deluxe, named Jack Herrera collectively. A full album, titled Retro Futuristo, was put together, but never officially released.

Discography

Studio albums

Compilations
1999: Love Hurts
2002: Are U Still Down: Greatest Hits
2013: B-Sides Collection

Mixtapes
2013: Digital Dynasty R&B 3

Singles

Notes

Awards and nominations

Other honors
On January 15, 2016, Rep. Carlos E. Tobon and Mayor Don Grebien presented Jon B. with a state citation and a key to the City of Pawtucket

References

External links
 
 

1974 births
550 Music artists
American contemporary R&B singers
American male singer-songwriters
American male pop singers
Record producers from Rhode Island
American people of Dutch descent
Jewish American musicians
Living people
Musicians from Providence, Rhode Island
Songwriters from Rhode Island
21st-century American singers
21st-century American male singers
MNRK Music Group artists
Sanctuary Records artists
Epic Records artists
21st-century American Jews